Manmangalam is a village in Tamil Nadu, India, in the Manmangalam created on 12 February 2014 by chief minister Dr. J. Jayalalitha through a tv conference from Chennai headquarters taluk of Karur district.

It is 9 km north of the district headquarters Karur, and 383 km from the state capital Chennai. Tamil is the local language.

Transport 

The nearest railway stations are at Moorthipalayam (4 km),Vangal (6 km),Karur junction (7 km) and Pugalur (9 km). The nearest airport is at Trichy (78 km).

References 

Villages in Karur district